Shen Po-tsang (born 31 August 1977 in Taiwan) is a Taiwanese baseball player who played for the Uni-President Lions of the Chinese Professional Baseball League. He played as short reliever for the Lions.

See also
 Chinese Professional Baseball League
 Uni-President Lions

References

1977 births
Living people
Uni-President 7-Eleven Lions players
Baseball players from Taipei
Asian Games medalists in baseball
Baseball players at the 1998 Asian Games
Medalists at the 1998 Asian Games
Asian Games bronze medalists for Chinese Taipei